Barry Wine is a former restaurateur and current restaurant consultant. His restaurant The Quilted Giraffe, founded with his now ex-wife Susan, was one of the most lauded eateries in the United States for its time.  The Quilted Giraffe was first opened in New Paltz, New York, in 1975 and moved to 50th Street in Manhattan, New York City, in 1979. The Quilted Giraffe reopened in 550 Madison Avenue (then the AT&T Building) at 55th Street and Madison Avenue in 1987. The restaurant closed at the end of 1992 when Sony purchased the building and bought out the Wines' lease.

Wine married Elizabeth Wadsworth in 2000. In the second stage of his restaurant career Wine became a consultant. He was hired in 2006 by Tishman Speyer, which managed Rockefeller Center, to handle the transition of the Rainbow Room restaurant at 30 Rockefeller Plaza, which had been previously run by the Cipriani firm. Barry's son is Thatcher Wine, a notable book curator.

References

External links
The Quilted Giraffe in retrospect in the NY Times
WEDDINGS; Elizabeth Wadsworth, Barry Wine
"Moving Beyond the Kitchen"
"Country Chic"
"Culinary Inspiration in New Paltz"
"Soft Landing for Owners After the Quilted Giraffe"

Year of birth missing (living people)
Living people
American restaurateurs